Vexillum amabile, common name the friendly mitre, is a species of small sea snail, marine gastropod mollusk in the family Costellariidae, the ribbed miters.

Description
The shell size varies between 10 mm and 20 mm.

(Original description) The sovate shell is rather thick. The spire is obtusely depressed. The whorls are somewhat rounded, longitudinally ribbed, transversely impressly grooved. The colour is ashy grey, variously banded with white. The columella is four-plaited. The aperture is rather short, its interior brown. 

(Described as Mitra encausta) A small, very decidedly marked species, most remarkable for the deeply incised, somewhat punctate, dark revolving lines on an ash-colored ground, its wave-like folds and its short rhomboidal form. 

The color of the shell is ashy or pinkish gray, with a broad white superior band, and sometimes narrow white revolving lines below it.

Life cycle 
Embryos develop into planktonic trocophore larvae and later into juvenile veligers before becoming fully grown adults.

Distribution
This species occurs in the Red Sea and in the Indian Ocean off Madagascar, the Mascarene Basin, Mauritius and Tanzania; in the Pacific Ocean off the Philippines and Papua New Guinea.

References

 Dautzenberg, Ph. (1929). Mollusques testacés marins de Madagascar. Faune des Colonies Francaises, Tome III
 Drivas, J. & M. Jay (1988). Coquillages de La Réunion et de l'île Maurice
 Michel, C. (1988). Marine molluscs of Mauritius. Editions de l'Ocean Indien. Stanley, Rose Hill. Mauritius
 Turner H. 2001. Katalog der Familie Costellariidae Macdonald, 1860. Conchbooks. 1–100 page(s): 31

External links
 
F. Welter Schultes 2014. http://www.animalbase.uni-goettingen.de/zooweb/servlet/AnimalBase/home/species?id=8525

amabile
Gastropods described in 1845